"When I See U" is a song recorded by American singer Fantasia Barrino for her second studio album, Fantasia (2006). It written by Louis Biancaniello, Waynne Nugent, Erika Nuri, Kevin Risto, Janet Sewell, Sam Watters, and produced by Midi Mafia along with Mzmeriq.  A R&B ballad, it was released to positive reviews by critics as the album's second single in April 2007. Its digital release spawned several remixes, three of which featured rappers Remy Ma, Young Jeezy, Lumidee, B.G. and Polow da Don. In 2021, the song was remixed by Florida rapper Foolio.

Upon release, it reached number one on the US Billboard Hot R&B/Hip-Hop Songs chart, and spent a year on the chart, one of only fourteen songs in history to achieve that feat. It was eventually ranked eighth on the chart's decade-end ranking. In December 2007, "When I See U" earned two Grammy Award nominations for Best Female R&B Vocal Performance and Best R&B Song. It lost in both categories to Alicia Keys' "No One" at the 50th Grammy Awards ceremony.

Chart performance
"When I See U" debuted at number ninety-nine on the Billboard Hot 100 in April 2007. It was Fantasia's first  to enter the chart since "Free Yourself" in 2005. The song peaked at number thirty-two on the chart, becoming more successful than Fantasias first single, "Hood Boy", which failed to chart. It also reached number one for nine weeks on Billboard'''s Hot R&B/Hip-Hop Songs chart. "When I See U" was Fantasia's first single to reach the top ten on the chart since "Free Yourself" in 2005, and her first single to top the chart. The song spent 58 weeks on the Hot R&B/Hip-Hop chart, the 13th longest running song in the chart's history. It is also credited with re-energizing sales of Fantasia, causing the album to re-enter the top 100 of the Billboard 200 chart.

In September 2007, "When I See U" hit number one on the Billboard Hot 100 Recurrent Airplay chart, making it Fantasia's fifth chart topping recurrent hit on the Hot 100 section (single and airplay). It was announced in December 2009 by Billboard magazine that "When I See U" was the eighth biggest hit of the decade on the Hot R&B/Hip-Hop Songs chart.

Music video
The video was shot by director Lenny Bass on March 26, 2007. It premiered on BET's Access Granted April 25, 2007 and on Yahoo! Music on April 26. The music video debuted on BET's top ten video countdown show 106 & Park'' on May 9.

The video begins with Fantasia singing on a rooftop, with scenes of her taking a bath in a tub interceding. After that, she walks to meet her love interest (NFL running back, Larry Johnson, who at the time played for the Kansas City Chiefs). At the end of the music video, she finally meets him and they embrace and, eventually, kiss. The video fades out on a shot of the stars and moon. Throughout the video, people in love are shown, ranging from children in their "puppy love" stages to elderly couples who have been married a long time.

Charts

Weekly charts

Year-end charts

Certifications

See also
List of number-one R&B singles of 2007 (U.S.)

References

2007 singles
Fantasia Barrino songs
Songs written by Sam Watters
Songs written by Louis Biancaniello
Songs written by Erika Nuri
Song recordings produced by Midi Mafia
2006 songs
J Records singles
Contemporary R&B ballads
2000s ballads